Richard Ames may refer to:

 Richard Ames (politician), Canadian politician
 Richard Ames, fictional character
 Richard Ames (poet)